Glåmdalen or Glommadal is a valley in Innlandet county (formerly Hedmark County) in Eastern Norway. The valley was formed by the river Glomma (also called Glåma), one of the major rivers for the region. The name "Glåmdalen" is also a newer designation for the traditional district which lies around the river Glomma, although it is most often used to refer to the southern part of the broader valley of Østerdalen.

Geography
From Lake Aursund in the far north in Røros all the way south to Elverum, the valley surrounding the river Glåma is called the Østerdalen. From Elverum south to Kongsvinger, the valley is referred to as Solør. As in turns westerly from Kongsvinger until it gets to Nes in the traditional district of Romerike in Akershus county, the Glåmdalen is called the Odalen. These designations are traditional districts, reflecting the designations locals used for their region. The newer term "Glåmdalen" is often used for the Solør and Odalen areas together.

Administration
Regional Councils in Norway are inter-municipal councils that were formed between neighboring municipalities in a district or particular geographical area. Each is operated with its own statutes or cooperative agreements on a wide field of activity. Seven municipalities in Innlandet cooperate in the Glåmdal Regional Council:
Sør-Odal
Nord-Odal
Kongsvinger
Eidskog
Grue
Åsnes
Våler

References

External links
Glåmdal regionråd

Districts of Innlandet
Valleys of Innlandet